Askira/Uba is a Local Government Area of Borno State, Nigeria. Its headquarters are in the town of Askira.
 
It has an area of  2,362 km and a population of 138,091 at the 2006 census.

The postal code of the area is 601.

One of the villages of Askira/Uba, Lassa, was the origin of a new virus found in the blood of returning American missionaries, and first identified by a virology research team in a laboratory at Yale University, who named it "Lassa virus" after the location where it first appeared.

In July 2014, the villages of Huyim and Dille in Askira/Uba LGA were attacked by suspected Boko Haram gunmen, with nine and thirty-eight deaths respectively. The attackers came from the Sambisa Forest. Displaced residents  "need help from governments and spirited individuals."

References

Local Government Areas in Borno State
Populated places in Borno State